Kaloomteʼ Bahlam, also known as Curl Head (died after ), was an ajaw or lord of the Maya city of Tikal. He co-ruled with a Lady of Tikal. The monuments associated with Kaloomteʼ Bahlam are Stelae 10, 12 and 25.

Notes

Footnotes

References

Date of birth unknown
Date of death unknown
Rulers of Tikal
6th century in the Maya civilization
6th-century monarchs in North America